Vallègue is a commune in the Haute-Garonne department in southwestern France.

Population

Sights
The Château de Vallègue is a mediaeval castle which is listed as a historic site by the French Ministry of Culture.

See also
Communes of the Haute-Garonne department

References

Communes of Haute-Garonne